Green October Event 2016 was the 2nd edition of Green October Event held on 1 October 2016 at Oriental Hotel, Victoria Island, Lagos, Nigeria.

Layole Oyatogun and Zoe Chinaka hosted the second edition of the event, while Tomi Odunsi, Swazzi, SoulPrinz, Ozzybosco and Ejen performed at the event. It was focused on children living with autism in Nigeria.

Fashion designers that showcased their designs were Agatha Moreno, VickyHeldan, Seraphine By Kosi, Omoge Collections, TUBO, Bella House Of Fab, Runo Stitches, Onome Dupri Clothing, Lola Baej, PenonPaul Bespoke, Mobiz World, GMYT Couture, Renew By Rukky, E22, Boriah, JPKOUTURE and MERCY'S.

Award recipients
The second edition of Green October Event was held on 1 October 2016 at Oriental Hotel, Victoria Island, Lagos, Nigeria.

Humanitarian awards
Adebunmi Odiakosa- Humanitarian of the Year
Sahara Foundation- Humanitarian Organization of the Year
Chika Ike- Humanitarian Celebrity of the Year
The Tonto Dike Foundation- Most Outstanding NGO/Foundation of the Year

Fashion awards
Swanky Jerry- Fashion Stylist of the Year
Beautifixx- Makeup Artist of the Year
Sarah Jatto- Fashion Model of the Year
Laura Ikeji- Fashion Blogger of the Year
Reze Bonna- Fashion Photographer of the Year
Toju Foyeh- Fashion Designer of the Year
Agatha Moreno- Most Creative Emerging Fashion Designer of the Year
Bryan Okwara- Most Stylish Male Celebrity of the Year
Mercy Aigbe- Most Stylish Female Celebrity of the Year

Recognition awards
Zainab S. Bagudu- For Humanitarian Support to Children in Nigeria
Babatope Agbeyo- For Excellence
Olakunle Jamiu Azeez- For Humanitarian Support to Orphans and Widows in Nigeria
Onobello- For Contribution to the Fashion and Entertainment Industry
Princess K. Oghene- For Tremendous Contribution to the Fashion Industry
BellaNaija- For Contribution to the Fashion and Entertainment Industry
Aisha Bello- For Contribution to the Modeling and Fashion Industry
Emmanuel Ikubese- For Contribution Against Domestic Violence
Laurie Idahosa- For Humanitarian Support to Humanity
Olakunle Churchill- For Significant Humanitarian Contribution to Humanity
Bolanle Adewole- For Humanitarian Service to Humanity

References

Nigerian awards
Business and industry awards
Awards for contributions to society
Humanitarian and service awards